Oratosquilla oratoria, the Japanese mantis shrimp, is a species of mantis shrimp found in the Western Pacific. Like other members of its order it has a powerful spear, which it uses to hunt invertebrates and small fish.

Coloring 

The overall color of the Japanese mantis shrimp is light grey to light brown with dark red grooves running down the thorax and abdomen; The color of its posterior tips is dark green.

Habitat 
Japanese mantis shrimp typically reside in a wide variety of habitats including the shore, coral reefs, and level substrates. It is native to the Northwestern Pacific in the oceans near Korea, Japan, Taiwan, China, and Vietnam. In recent years the Japanese mantis shrimp has been artificially introduced to oceans near Australia and New Zealand where it has become an invasive species. It occupies long U shaped burrows in soft sediments which it excavates with its maxillipeds. It stays tucked away within these burrows in the daylight hours for refuge and rarely emerges except in the night. These burrows are also used to spawn and lay eggs in. If the burrow is not of compatible size, egg laying is inhibited and as a result if the burrow becomes too small, the Japanese mantis shrimp will expand its burrow or create a more suitably sized one.

Hunting and diet 
The Japanese mantis shrimp is a predator that actively hunts and kills its prey. At night it emerges from its burrow to hunt prey which it then brings back to their burrow in order to feed. It is considered to be a type in between spearer types, which use their claws to pierce soft bodied prey, and smasher types, which use a club to smash hard bodied prey. It feeds on an assortment of organisms varying with habitat including crustaceans, mollusks, small rays, small fishes, worms and algae. It has also been observed to cannibalize smaller members of their species in times of food scarcity.

Reproduction and life cycle 
Reproduction for Japanese mantis shrimp occurs between mature inter molt pairs. Female Japanese mantis shrimp achieve reproductive maturity by late spring to early summer lasting until fall while males have year round reproductive maturity. There are several behavioral components in its courtship. One mating behavior that it demonstrates is attenuation between male and female where they face each other and mutually stroke antennas for several seconds. They have also been found to engage in pair walking, where mates walk closely together side by side, and engage in brushing where the male brushes the female with its appendages. After fertilization the females spawn in the burrow and the female subsequently nurses the eggs until they hatch. Females devote significant periods of time to nursing their eggs and as a result rarely leave their burrows unless to feed. When emerging from their burrow the female carries her eggs in her maxillipeds for safekeeping. In the period shortly before the eggs hatch the female has been observed to neglect the eggs and feed more frequently. The typical embryonic life of an egg is about 14 days. The larvae of the Japanese mantis shrimp follows 11 larval stages with active swimming and feeding beginning in the third larval stage. The larval stage ends in around 32 to 51 days and the juvenile stage begins.

In cuisine 
The consumption of the Japanese mantis shrimp can for the most part be only found in Japan as the price and availability of it limits its popularity abroad. It is most tasty during the period of spring as it is their breeding season and is occasionally also eaten with its roe. Its texture and flavor is said to be somewhere in between eel and shrimp. The appearance of shako in the form of sushi began in the 1950s where it was commonly brushed with nitsume and presented as nigiri. Shako was originally prepared by boiling it in a sugar syrup, but is now typically prepared through a slow simmer allowing its freshness to last longer.

Gallery

References

Stomatopoda
Edible crustaceans
Japanese seafood
Crustaceans described in 1844
Taxa named by Wilhem de Haan
Korean seafood